Mouchon is a surname.  Notable people with the surname include:

 Louis-Eugène Mouchon (1843–1914), French painter.
 Pierre Mouchon (1733–1797), eighteenth-century Swiss pastor.